A Diamond Rio Christmas: The Star Still Shines is the eighth studio and first and-to-date only christmas album from noted country artists Diamond Rio. The album was the band's first release on their new label, Word Records.  The album peaked at number 57 on the Billboard Country chart.

Track listing

Personnel 

Diamond Rio
 Marty Roe – lead vocals 
 Dan Truman – keyboards, acoustic piano, string arrangements
 Jimmy Olander – programming, acoustic guitar, electric guitars, banjo, string arrangements
 Gene Johnson – mandolin, backing vocals
 Dana Williams – bass, backing vocals 
 Brian Prout – drums

Production 
 Diamond Rio – producers
 Mike Clute – producer, engineer, mixing 
 Jimmy Olander – engineer 
 Hank Williams – mastering 
 Katherine Petillo – creative director 
 Russ Harrington – photography 
 Paula Turner – groomer

Chart performance

Word Records albums
Diamond Rio albums
Christmas albums by American artists
2007 Christmas albums
Country Christmas albums